WLYM-LP (90.9 FM, Amor 90.9) is a radio station broadcasting an Adult Contemporary format. Licensed to Mayagüez-Añasco, Puerto Rico, the station serves the western Puerto Rico area. The station is currently owned by Feeding Homeless Corporation.

External links

LYM-LP
Radio stations established in 2015
2015 establishments in Puerto Rico
LYM-LP
Añasco, Puerto Rico